Onich (Gaelic: Omhanaich, 'abounding in froth, frothy place'), also spelled Ounich, is a village in the historic county of Inverness-shire on the east shore of Loch Linnhe, Scotland and, together with North Ballachulish at the entrance to Loch Leven, forms Nether Lochaber.

Area
St Bride’s Church  was built in 1874 by the Edinburgh architect John Garden Brown. Onich to North Ballachulish Woods forms a Special Area of Conservation because of its old sessile oak woods with Ilex and Blechnum.

Climate
As with the rest of the British Isles, Onich experiences a maritime climate with cool summers and mild winters. Onich holds the record for highest temperature reported,  for this part of Scotland (also the furthest north such a high value has been recorded in the British Isles). It also holds the highest Scottish minimum temperature for July at 20.0.C set in July 1948.

References

External links 

Populated places in Lochaber